
Chojnice County is a unit of territorial administration and local government (powiat) in Pomeranian Voivodeship, northern Poland. It came into being on January 1, 1999, as a result of the Polish local government reforms passed in 1998.

As of 2019 its total population is 97,616, out of which the population of Chojnice is 39,890, that of Czersk is 9,910, that of Brusy is 5,188, and the rural population is 42,628.

Chojnice County on a map of the counties of Pomeranian Voivodeship

Chojnice County is bordered by Bytów County and Kościerzyna County to the north, Starogard County and Tuchola County to the east, Sępólno County to the south, and Człuchów County to the west.

History
Between 1172 and 1920 the county, with varying boundaries, was part of Prussia. Following the First World War this part of West Prussia was awarded to Poland by the Treaty of Versailles. From 1938 to 1945 the Landkreis Konitz was part of the newly created Reichsgau Danzig-West Prussia.

Administrative divisions
The county is subdivided into five gminas (one urban, two urban-rural and two rural). These are listed in the following table, in descending order of population.

Culture

Monuments 
On the list of the National Heritage Institute there are 54 objects from Chojnie County.

Referring to Voivodship Register of Monuments, there are over 808 objects located in the county. Most historical buildings are located in the commune of Chojnice - 294 items, and the least in the commune of Konarzyny - 41.

References

 
Chojnice